The Huck-a-Bucks was a Washington, D.C.-based go-go band formed in the early 1990s. The band was active in the Washington metropolitan area, producing numerous songs in the Washington music scene and several hits nationwide, including the single "The Bud". The band members consisted of Joseph "Lil Joey" Timms rapping/singing, Charles "Ricky" Yancy, Lamont "Ray-Ray" Ray playing percussions, Rob "RJ" Folson, DeCarlos Cunningham, keyboardist Lorenzo Wiliams, drummer Felix Stevenson, and Sequan "Quan" Jones playing congas and percussions.

Discography

Albums
Chronic Breakdown (Liaison, 1995)  
Live! (Liaison, 1995)
You Betta' Move Somethin'! (Sound By Charlie, 1997)

Songs
"Sexy Girl" (1995)
"The Bud" (1995)
"Kombat" (1995)
"Sprinkle" (1995)

References

External links
Huck-A-Bucks at AllMusic
Huck-A-Bucks at Last.fm

African-American musical groups
American funk musical groups
Go-go musical groups
Musical groups from Washington, D.C.